Noel Baring Hudson  (18 December 1893 – 5 October 1970) was an Anglican bishop who served at Labuan and Sarawak, St Albans, Newcastle and Ely.  He was a first-class Rugby Union player, a brave and successful soldier and an eminent senior cleric.

Hudson was the sixth son of the Reverend Thomas Hudson and his wife Alethea Matheson. He was educated at St Edward's School, Oxford, where his father had been headmaster. His maternal grandmother, Alethea Hayter, was the sister of Henry Heylyn Hayter (an Australian statist) and Harrison Hayter (an engineer) who married Charles Matheson of the Clergy Orphan School where his father had also taught. Hudson went on to Christ's College, Cambridge, where he was Tancred Student.

In 1914, on the outbreak of World War I, he joined the Royal Berkshire Regiment. Personally, Hudson had an outstanding War record but it was marred by grief since two of his brothers were killed and another wounded. He would end the War having been awarded a DSO and Bar and a MC and Bar and being twice Mentioned in Despatches; he was wounded in 15 places and was an acting brigadier even though he was only 24. There are citations for all four DSO and MC awards, and his first DSO is a graphic example of the bravery he displayed.

'For consistent gallantry and able leadership, particularly on 8 August 1918, south of Morlancourt, when he personally led his battalion forward to the attack through heavy fog and intense shell and machine gun fire.  When they were held up by machine guns he pushed forward alone, knocking out one of the machine guns and getting wounded in doing so. In spite of this, he rushed two other machine guns which were holding up the advance, and continued to lead his battalion forward until he was again seriously wounded by machine-gun fire in three places. He showed splendid courage and determination.'

By 1914, Hudson had already shown considerable promise as a Rugby Union running standoff half and Centre threequarter. He played for Harlequins and Cambridge University and seems to have narrowly missed a Blue. In 1919,having recovered from war wounds, he was captain of Harlequins but again failed to gain a coveted Blue despite appearing regularly in the XV. He would later play for Headingley and Yorkshire.

At the end of the war, Hudson went to Westcott House, Cambridge, then to Leeds Clergy School, and in 1921 began his ordained ministry in the parish of Christ Church, Leeds. In 1922 he became vicar of the same parish. After four years in Leeds he was appointed to St John the Baptist's Newcastle upon Tyne. There he distinguished himself in setting a pattern of one paramount, uniting Parish Eucharist for the whole family every Sunday morning instead of five separate services and in social work including converting decaying flats into decent accommodation with modest rents for poor families. In 1931, at the age of 39, he became Bishop of Labuan and Sarawak for seven years. The diocese covered an area as large as the UK, but travelling was tortuous, by launch, canoe and on foot along jungle paths in tropical heat. Hudson's main task was to unite the work of the Mission Stations in the diocese at which he had some success In 1938 he was recalled to become secretary of the Society for the Propagation of the Gospel in Foreign Parts. Archbishop Lang told Hudson that he regarded this post as Chief of Staff to the Anglian Communion. In 1940, Hudson was sent to the US to receive a donation from the American Episcopal Church which eventually amounted to $300,000 to support overseas dioceses. He had, for a short time during the Great War, Kermit Roosevelt MC as a liaison officer, and the Roosevelt connection facilitated introductions and a lecture tour. In 1939 he had become an honorary canon and an assistant bishop in the Diocese of St Albans and was also Select Preacher in Cambridge. On 2 October 1941 he was nominated and on 19 October confirmed as Bishop of Newcastle where he remained for nearly 16 years. He was a greatly-admired Bishop and continued a Newcastle tradition as 'one of the happiest places for a priest to work'. In Hudson's time there as Bishop, young men were attracted to starting careers in the diocese. John Ramsbotham was later Bishop of Wakefield, Hugh Montefiore became Bishop of Birmingham and Robert Runcie was appointed Archbishop of Canterbury in 1979. Hudson 'saw his episcopate primarily in terms of the care and leadership of the clergy. It was the job of the parish priest to care for his own people' On 18 January 1957 he became Bishop of Ely until 1963.

Hudson's translation to Ely was an example of a misfiring appointments process in which the Prime Minister and his patronage secretary had the key role.  Archbishop Fisher had recommended Hudson as his first preference for the vacancies at Peterborough and Lincoln in 1956, apparently knowing that, for some reason, the PM would not select Hudson, probably on the advice of the outgoing secretary. So it had turned out and others were appointed. However, there was a change of patronage secretary and the new officeholder assumed that Fisher's support for Hudson's preferment was unqualified. The new patronage secretary had discovered disharmony in Ely between the cathedral and the late bishop and concluded that a commander-in-chief figure was needed to resolve the problems. Hudson seemed ideal and the PM approved the recommendation.  Fisher could hardly object and was left simply working out a future modus operandi with the new patronage secretary. Fisher's reservations about Hudson proved to be accurate.  Extremely shy by nature, 'he sought to hide this fact behind a boisterous bonhomie which was sometimes misunderstood' This was worsened by the return of pain from war wounds and increasing deafness.  Hudson soldiered on for five years and then retired. His last years were spent in a flat in Maida Vale and he died in 1970.

He had very distinguished Rugby Union, military and episcopal careers, the only blemish being at Ely.

Hudson's sister, Elizabeth Hudson, married Frederick Gordon-Lennox, 9th Duke of Richmond.

References

Times Obituary, October 1970
Who's Who

1893 births
1970 deaths
Royal Berkshire Regiment officers
British Army personnel of World War I
Companions of the Distinguished Service Order
Recipients of the Military Cross
Alumni of Christ's College, Cambridge
Harlequin F.C. players
Anglican bishops of Labuan and Sarawak
Bishops of Ely
Bishops of Newcastle
20th-century Anglican bishops in Asia
People educated at St Edward's School, Oxford
English expatriates in Malaysia
Alumni of Westcott House, Cambridge
20th-century Church of England bishops